Jang Kyong-il (born 27 December 1985) is a North Korean former footballer. He represented North Korea on at least one occasion in 2007.

Career statistics

International

References

1985 births
Living people
North Korean footballers
North Korea international footballers
Association football midfielders